Mohammed Achaari (born 1951) is a Moroccan writer and politician.

Early life
He was born in Moulay Driss Zerhoun. He studied  law at the Mohammed V University and graduated in 1976. He published a collection of short stories,  six collections of poetry and one novel. Some of his works have been translated into French, Spanish, Russian and Dutch. He wrote 
articles for several Moroccan newspapers like Al-Alam and Al Ittihad Al Ichtiraki.

Political life
During the early 1980s, he was jailed for his political activities. He has been  elected president of the Moroccan Union of Writers twice in the period 1989-96. In 1997, Achaari was elected delegate for Rabat and in 1998  he became Minister of Culture and in 2002 delegate for Meknes.

2011 Arabic Booker Prize
Achaari was announced joint winner of the 2011 Arabic Booker Prize for his novel The Arch and the Butterfly. He shared the prize with the Saudi writer Rajaa Alem.

Bibliography
El Jardin De La Soledad/The Garden of Solitude   (Poem collection in bilingual English and Spanish translation), translated by Khalid Raissouni and Trino Cruz, ed. by Quorum, 2005

External links
Banipal, magazine of modern Arab literature (with photo of Mohamed Achaari)  (retrieved 04-16-2008)
 Jadaliyya, Review of The Arch and the Butterfly 

1951 births
Living people
Ministers of Communications of Morocco
Government ministers of Morocco
Moroccan male journalists
20th-century Moroccan poets
Moroccan novelists
Moroccan male writers
Male novelists
People from Moulay Driss Zerhoun
Mohammed V University alumni
21st-century Moroccan poets
International Prize for Arabic Fiction winners